The following is a list of notable deaths in January 2000.

Entries for each day are listed alphabetically by surname. A typical entry lists information in the following sequence:
 Name, age, country of citizenship at birth, subsequent country of citizenship (if applicable), reason for notability, cause of death (if known), and reference.

January 2000

1
Larry Bearnarth, 58, American Major League Baseball player, heart attack.
Maurice Hallam, 68, English cricket player.
Dick Pabich, 44, American gay rights activist, AIDS.
Stan Patrick, 77, American NBA basketball player.
Gerda Paumgarten, 92, Austrian alpine skier and world champion.
Colin Vaughan, 68, Australian-Canadian television journalist, architect, and urban activist, heart attack.

2
Nat Adderley, 68, American jazz musician, stroke.
Princess María, 89, Spanish royal and grandmother of King Felipe VI, heart attack.
Ed Doherty, 81, American football player and coach.
Henri René Guieu, 73, French science fiction writer, cancer.
Patrick O'Brian, 85, English writer.
Ullin Place, 75, British philosopher and psychologist.
Anna Maria Martínez Sagi, 92, Spanish poet, trade unionist, journalist, and feminist.
Elmo Zumwalt, 79, United States Navy officer, cancer.

3
Gabriela Brimmer, 52, Mexican writer and activist, heart attack.
Henry H. Fowler, 91, American lawyer and politician, Secretary of the Treasury, pneumonia.
Viktor Kolotov, 50, Soviet/Ukrainian football player.
Frank Miller, 83, Irish cricket player.

4
Alfred Bohrmann, 95, German astronomer.
Tom Fears, 77, Mexican-American football player (Los Angeles Rams) and member of the Pro Football Hall of Fame.
Marta Hoepffner, 88, German artist and photographer.
Diether Krebs, 52, German actor, cabaret artist and comedian, lung cancer.
Spiridon Markezinis, 90, Greek politician and Prime Minister.
John Milner, 50, American baseball player, lung cancer.
Louis Mucci, 90, American jazz trumpeter.
Henry Pleasants, 89, American music critic and intelligence officer, ruptured aorta.

5
Turid Balke, 78, Norwegian actress, playwright and artist.
Xie Bingying, 93, Chinese soldier and writer.
Bernard Braine, 85, British politician.
Goseki Kojima, 71, Japanese manga artist.
Kumar Ponnambalam, 61, Sri Lankan Tamil lawyer and politician, assassinated.
Hopper Read, 89, English cricketer.
Vic Schoen, 83, American bandleader, arranger and composer.
K. L. Shrimali, 90, Indian politician and educationist.
Bernhard Wicki, 80, Austrian actor and film director.

6
Leonard F. Chapman, Jr., 86, United States Marine Corps general, cancer.
Michael Rex Horne, 78, English structural engineer, scientist and academic.
Byron L. Johnson, 82, American economist and politician.
Thomas Jamison MacBride, 85, American jurist.
Don Martin, 68, American cartoonist (MAD Magazine), cancer.
Edward Pain, 74, Australian Olympic rower.
Malvina Polo, 96, American film actress.
Horst Seemann, 62, German film director and screenwriter.
Ajit Pratap Singh, 82, Indian politician.
Robert McG. Thomas, Jr., 60, American journalist and obituarist, abdominal cancer.
Alexey Vyzmanavin, 40, Russian chess Grandmaster, heart attack.

7
Zainal Abidin, 71, Indonesian actor.
Gary Albright, 36, American professional wrestler, heart attack.
Robert B. Crosby, 88, American politician.
Makhmud Esambayev, 75, Soviet and Russian actor and dancer.
Ken Keyworth, 65, English football player.
Bob McFadden, 76, American voice actor, amyotrophic lateral sclerosis.
Bernice Petkere, 98, American songwriter.
Dorian Shainin, 85, American quality consultant, aeronautics engineer, and author.
Rodica Simion, 44, Romanian-American mathematician.
Klaus Wennemann, 59, German television and film actor, lung cancer.

8
Karl Adamek, 89, Austrian football player and manager.
Bill Domm, 69, Canadian politician.
Henry Eriksson, 79, Swedish middle-distance runner and Olympic champion.
Ray Huang, 81, Chinese historian and philosopher, heart attack.
Hilary Smart, 74, American sailor and Olympic champion.
Jack Stokes, 76, Canadian politician, lung cancer.
Fritz Thiedemann, 81, German equestrian,.
Warren H. Wagner, 79, American botanist.

9
Marguerite Churchill, 89, American film actress.
Edward R. Cony, 76, American journalist and newspaper executive, pneumonia and complications from Alzheimer's.
Arnold Alexander Hall, 84, British aeronautical engineer, scientist and industrialist.
Poul Mejer, 68, Danish football player.
Nigel Tranter, 90, Scottish writer.
Bruno Zevi, 81, Italian architect, historian, curator and author.

10
Arthur Batanides, 76, American film and television actor.
Maxine Elliott Hicks, 95, American actress.
Sam Jaffe, 98, American motion picture agent, producer, studio executive.
Gibson Jalo, 60, Nigerian army general.
Richard Jameson, 47, Northern Irish loyalist and paramilitary commander, shot.
Cliff Lloyd, 83, Welsh football player.
John Newland, 82, American director and actor, stroke.

11
Betty Archdale, 92, English-Australian sportswoman and educationalist.
Phil Carrick, 47, English cricketer, leukemia.
Helena Carter, 76, American actress.
Barney Childs, 73, American composer and teacher, Parkinson's disease.
Wilhelm Grewe, 88, German diplomat and professor of international law.
Bob Lemon, 79, American baseball player and manager.
Solomon Mamaloni, 56, Solomon Islands politician and Prime Minister, kidney disease.
William Andrew McDonald, 86, American archaeologist.
Ralph Purchase, 83, American competition rower and Olympic champion.
Gordon Wright, 87, American historian.
Pavao Žanić, 81, Yugoslav prelate of the Catholic Church.

12
Marc Davis, 86, American animator (Cinderella, Sleeping Beauty, Bambi).
Dan Duchaine, 47, American bodybuilder, author, and convicted felon, polycystic kidney disease.
V. R. Nedunchezhiyan, 79, Indian politician, Chief Minister of Tamil Nadu, heart failure.
Bobby Phills, 30, American basketball player, car accident.
Margaret Hutchinson Rousseau, 89, American chemical engineer.
Alex Wright, 69, Scottish football player and manager.

13
Peter Henderson, Baron Henderson of Brompton, 77, British public servant, Clerk of the Parliaments.
Eric Dodson, 79, British actor.
Herbert S. Gutowsky, 80, American chemist.
Antti Hyvärinen, 67, Finnish ski jumper, coach and Olympic champion.
Elizabeth Kerr, 87, American actress, theatre producer and director.
Alvin Liberman, 82, American psychologist, complications during heart surgery.
John Ljunggren, 80, Swedish race walker and Olympic champion.
Alfred Nzo, 74, South African political activist.
Susumu Ohno, 71, Japanese-American geneticist and evolutionary biologist.
Enric Valor i Vives, 88, Spanish writer and grammarian.

14
Meche Barba, 77, American-Mexican film actress and dancer, heart attack.
Alphonse Boudard, 74, French novelist and playwright.
Pat Boyette, 76, American broadcaster and comic book artist (Peacemaker), esophagus cancer.
Giusi Raspani Dandolo, 83, Italian stage, film, television and radio actress.
Guadalupe Huerta, 79, American hispanic activist and lobbyist.
Bijan Jalali, 72, Iranian poet and writer.
Hans-Joachim Kahler, 91, German general during World War II.
Alain Poiré, 82, French film producer, cancer.
Clifford Truesdell, 80, American mathematician.
M. V. Venkatram, 79, Indian writer from Tamil Nadu.
Leonard Weisgard, 83, American children's writer and illustrator.
Tomislav Zografski, 65, Macedonian composer.

15
Beryl Clark, 82, American gridiron football player.
Georges-Henri Lévesque, 96, Canadian Dominican priest and sociologist.
Yves Mariot, 51, French football player, aneurysm.
Annie Palmen, 73, Dutch singer.
Arkan, 47, Serbian mobster and paramilitary commander, homicide.
Alf Ringstead, 72, Irish football player.
Fran Ryan, 83, American actress.

16
Wolf Ackva, 88, German actor.
Gene Harris, 66, American jazz pianist.
Will "Dub" Jones, 71, American R&B singer, diabetes.
T. N. Kaul, 87, Indian diplomat.
By Saam, 85, American sportscaster.
Robert R. Wilson, 85, American physicist and team member of the Manhattan Project.

17
Carl Forberg, 88, American racecar driver.
Stephen Fuchs, 91, Austrian Catholic priest, missionary, and anthropologist.
Andrej Hieng, 74, Slovene writer, playwright and theatre director.
Philip Jones, 71, British trumpeter.
Ralph Ambrose Kekwick, 91, British biochemist.
Ion Rațiu, 82, Romanian diplomat, journalist, writer, and politician.
Arthur Sager, 95, American track and field athlete and Olympian.
Hüseyin Velioğlu, 48, Kurdish Hezbollah leader, shot.

18
Alfred Nash Beadleston, Jr., 87, American politician.
Gordon Chalmers, 88, American swimmer, swimming coach, and Olympian.
Nancy Coleman, 87, American actress.
Frances Drake, 87, American actress.
Jester Hairston, 98, American actor and composer.
Francis Haskell, 71, English art historian.
Raymond Brendan Manning, 65, American carcinologist.
Gordon J. McCann, 92, Canadian thoroughbred horse trainer.
Arthur Nash, 85, Canadian ice hockey player and Olympian.
Margarete Schütte-Lihotzky, 102, Austrian communist resistance member during World War II.

19
Victor Brooks, 81, English film and television actor.
M. A. Chidambaram, 81, Indian industrialist and cricket administrator.
Luigi Chinazzo, 67, Italian wrestler and Olympian.
Bettino Craxi, 65, Italian politician, Prime Minister (1983-1987), diabetes.
Billy Dewell, 83, American gridiron football player.
Anselmo Fernandez, 81, Portuguese architect and football manager.
Victoria Fromkin, 76, American linguist, colorectal cancer.
Frederick Irving Herzberg, 76, American psychologist.
Hedy Lamarr, 85, Austrian actress (Samson and Delilah, Algiers, White Cargo), cardiovascular disease.
Manny Montejo, 64, Cuban baseball player (Detroit Tigers).
Lynn Myers, 85, American baseball player.
Alan North, 79, American actor (Serpico, Highlander, Glory), kidney cancer, lung cancer.
Irra Petina, 91, Russian-American actress, singer, and contralto.
Heinrich Schroeteler, 84, German sculptor and U-boat commander during World War II.
George Ledyard Stebbins, 94, American botanist, cancer.
Chhean Vam, 83, Cambodian politician and nationalist.
Stanley Weston, 76, British basketball player.
Rex Willis, 75, Welsh rugby union player.

20
Chuck Courtney, 69, American actor and stuntman, suicide.
Robert J. Henle, 90, American Catholic priest, jesuit, and philosopher.
Ron Herbel, 62, American baseball player.
Slavko Janevski, 80, Macedonian poet, prose and script writer.
Don Samuelson, 86, American politician, Governor of Idaho, heart attack.
Izabella Yurieva, 100, Soviet Russian romance singer.

21
Kristian Asdahl, 79, Norwegian politician.
John A. Calhoun, 81, American diplomat.
Dagmar Edqvist, 96, Swedish writer and screenwriter.
Saeb Salam, 95, Lebanese politician and Prime Minister, heart attack.

22
Victor Cavallo, 52, Italian actor and underground writer, hepatitis C.
Craig Claiborne, 79, American restaurant critic.
Ed Clark, 88, American photographer.
Carlo Cossutta, 67, Italian opera singer, liver cancer.
Al Costello, 80, Italian-Australian professional wrestler, pneumonia.
Peter Gould, 67, American geographer and academic.
Masao Harada, 87, Japanese athlete and Olympic silver medalist.
Anne Hébert, 83, French Canadian author and poet, bone cancer.
Alan Pryce-Jones, 91, British book critic, writer, journalist and politician.
Dai Suli, 80, Chinese politician.
Ernest William Swanton, 92, British cricket commentator.
Balaupasakage Yasodis Tudawe, 84, Sri Lankan politician.

23
Willie Hamilton, 82, British politician.
George Hoskins, 71, New Zealand runner and Olympian.
Nicholas Nagy-Talavera, 70, Hungarian-American dissident, historian and writer.
Roderick O'Connor, 90, Northern Irish politician .
William Alexander Sutton, 82, New Zealand painter.

24
Jeffrey Boam, 53, American screenwriter and film producer, heart failure.
Theodor Brinek, Jr., 78, Austrian football player.
Carl Thomas Curtis, 94, American politician.
Bobby Duncum, Jr., 34, American professional wrestler, accidental overdose.
Massimo Severo Giannini, 84, Italian lawyer and politician.
Tatyana Petrenko-Samusenko, 61, Soviet fencer and Olympic champion.
Reynolds Shultz, 78, American politician, Lieutenant Governor of Kansas.

25
Dale Alford, 83, American ophthalmologist and politician, congestive heart failure.
Folke Ekström, 93, Swedish chess master.
Herta Freitag, 91, Austrian-American mathematician.
Lin Halliday, 63, American saxophonist.
Aleksander Illi, 87, Estonian basketball player and basketball coach.
P. Lankesh, 64, Indian poet, writer, playwright and journalist, heart attack.

26
Don Budge, 84, American tennis player, traffic collision.
Kathleen Hale, 101, British artist, illustrator, and children's author.
Jean-Claude Izzo, 54, French poet, playwright, and novelist, cancer.
Adolf Pilch, 85, Polish resistance fighter during World War II.
Don Ralke, 79, American music arranger.
Bill Strickland, 91, American baseball player.
Adib Taherzadeh, 78, Iranian Baháʼí author.
A. E. van Vogt, 87, Canadian science fiction writer, pneumonia.

27
Don Abney, 76, American jazz pianist, complications from kidney dialysis.
Mae Faggs, 67, American sprinter, cancer.
Friedrich Gulda, 69, Austrian pianist, heart failure.
Matateu, 72, Portuguese footballer.
Setsuo Nara, 63, Japanese basketball player.
Jerzy Potz, 46, Polish ice hockey player, carcinoma.
Abner W. Sibal, 78, American politician.
Bert Sproston, 85, English footballer.

28
Sarah Caudwell, 60, British detective story writer and barrister, cancer.
Tony Doyle, 58, Irish television and film actor.
Lauris Edmond, 75, New Zealand poet and writer.
Ron Feiereisel, 68, American basketball player and coach.
Ted Gullic, 93, American baseball player.
Hugh Guthrie, 89, Australian politician.
Ed Hirsch, 78, American gridiron football player.
Bertel Lauring, 72, Danish film actor.
Gad Rausing, 77, Swedish industrialist.
Joy Shelton, 77, English actress, pulmonary emphysema.
Kenneth Waller, 72, British actor.

29
George McTurnan Kahin, 82, American historian and political scientist.
Herbert Schiller, 80, American media critic, sociologist, and author.
Hannes Schmidhauser, 73, Swiss actor and football player.
E. L. Senanayake, 79, Sri Lankan politician.
Harry Thompson, 84, English football player and manager.

30
Martin Aldridge, 25, English footballer, car crash.
Isidore Dollinger, 96, American politician.
Sigvard Arne Eklund, 88, Swedish politician.
Angelo Innocent Fernandes, 86, Indian Roman Catholic archbishop.
Karl-Friedrich Höcker, 88, German  war criminal and SS commander during World War II.
Steve Little, 34, American boxer, colon cancer.
Joseph Rothschild, 68, American historian and political scientist.

31
Martin Benrath, 73, German film actor, cancer.
Bendt Jørgensen, 75, Danish football player and manager.
Gil Kane, 73, American comic book artist (Green Lantern, Spider-Man, Atom), lymphoma.
Vasant Shankar Kanetkar, 79, Indian Marathi language playwright and novelist.
Ralph Manza, 78, American actor (Get Shorty, The D.A.'s Man, Godzilla).
Ross Russell, 90, American jazz producer and writer.
Jafar Salmasi, 81, Iranian weightlifter and Olympic medalist.
K. N. Singh, 91, Indian actor.
Arthur Wilson, 91, English footballer.
Si Zentner, 82, American trombonist and jazz big-band leader.

References 

2000-01
 01